The Supreme Court of Georgia is the highest judicial authority of the U.S. state of Georgia. The court was established in 1845 as a three-member panel. Since 1896, the justices (increased in number to six, then to seven in 1945, and finally to nine in 2017) have been elected by the people of the state. The justices are currently elected in statewide non-partisan elections for six-year terms, with any vacancies filled through an appointment by the Governor.

The first Chief Justice of the Court was Joseph Henry Lumpkin, who was appointed to that position in 1863. Under the current Constitution of Georgia, the Chief Justice is designated as "the chief presiding and administrative officer of the court," and is elected by the justices. The justices also elect a Presiding Justice to serve if the Chief Justice is absent or is disqualified. , the chief justice of the court is Michael P. Boggs, and the Presiding Justice is Nels S. D. Peterson. Both justices were sworn into their respective positions on July 18, 2022.

History 

Georgia was established as a state under the federal Constitution in 1788. In the state's early days the justice system was set up so that matters of law were settled at a local level with no appellate courts. In 1799, the Judiciary Act stated that the judges of Georgia would meet annually and discuss any laws or rules that may have or would cause argument among the state. This allowed much of the laws and rules to be somewhat uniform across the state. This did not last long, however, as the General Assembly (state legislature) repealed that procedure in 1801, referring any arguments then-outstanding back to each county for decision by the local presiding judge.

From then, the judges of the superior courts (the general trial courts) began conferring informally on difficult points of law. When a group of superior court judges declared an act of the legislature unconstitutional, however, the legislature in 1815 disapproved even of this practice.

At that point, with no way of ensuring superior court decisions would be uniform throughout the state, several successive governors from the 1820s to 1840s urged the creation of a supreme court. In 1828, Governor John Forsyth complained that the then-eight superior court judges were not bound by precedent from either their predecessors not from a higher court. As a result, there was neither "uniformity nor certainty in the laws for the security of the rights of persons or property. The confusion produced by contemporary contradictory decisions, everyday increases – property is held and recovered in one part, and lost in another part of the state under like circumstances – rights are asserted and maintained in one circuit, and denied in another, in analogous cases."

The state Constitution was finally amended in 1835 to authorize the establishment of a supreme court, but the court itself was not established by legislative act until 1845. The original court consisted of three justices: Joseph Henry Lumpkin as the presiding justice, Hiram Warner, and Eugenius A. Nisbet. Their salaries were $2,500 a year. The court held its first session in Talbotton, Georgia, on January 26, 1846, and held sessions by "riding circuit," that is, holding court at several locations throughout the superior court circuits of the state, traveling at their own expense.

Subsequent state constitutions and amendments have modified the composition and practice of the court. The 1865 Constitution, following the American Civil War, ended the practice of circuit-riding by providing that the court would sit in the state capital (today, Atlanta). An 1896 constitutional amendment expanded the court by three justices and provided for popular election of the justices. A seventh justice was added by an amendment in 1945. The current state constitution authorizes up to nine justices, and the eighth and ninth seats were created by the Appellate Jurisdiction Reform Act in 2016.

Justices

Current justices

Chief Justices

Jurisdiction 
The Supreme Court of Georgia has the right and authority over every case that involves the review of select appellate jurisdiction. The cases in which it can perform rule over are the cases that bring in question of constitutionality of a law, constitutional arrangement, or mandate. Any election contest can be judged by the Supreme Court of Georgia and the cases it has appellate jurisdiction in are the following:
 Cases including wills;
 Cases of divorce and alimony;
 Equity cases;
 Habeas Corpus cases;
 Cases certified to it by the Court of Appeals;
 Title to land cases;
 Cases in which a death sentence could be charged or was charged; and
 Extraordinary remedies cases.
Each justice can create an opinion, but it must be passed to the other justices, and after a discussion, depending on the majority, that opinion can be taken in or nulled. In the instance that any justice cannot serve in a case due to disqualification or any other reason, a judge to substitute has is sent by the Court to take that place.

Courtroom security
Courtroom security is provided by the Capitol Police Division of the Georgia Department of Public Safety.

Bar admissions 
The Supreme Court of Georgia is unusual among state high courts in that, while it sets forth and implements the rules for admitting new lawyers to the state bar, it does not formally conduct the admissions. Instead, new lawyers are admitted to practice by taking an oath before a judge of one of the superior courts (that is, a local trial-level court).

The Office of Bar Admissions is an administrative arm of the Supreme Court that is responsible for implementing the rules for admission. That Office assists two separate boards appointed by the Supreme Court. The Board to Determine Fitness of Bar Applicants handles "character and fitness" issues, inquiring into a candidate's "honesty, trustworthiness, diligence, [and] reliability" to determine fitness to practice law. The Board of Bar Examiners administers and grades the state's bar examination each February and July. Subject to educational and other criteria, the boards will certify for admission candidates who meet the character and fitness requirements and pass both the bar examination and the Multistate Professional Responsibility Examination. Candidates may then obtain admission to the Bar by appearing in superior court, and then separately seek admission to the Court of Appeals and the Supreme Court.

See also
Fiat justitia ruat caelum ("let justice be done though the heavens fall"), the phrase engraved on the wall behind the bench in the Supreme Court of Georgia
State Bar of Georgia
Courts of Georgia
Judiciary of Georgia
Georgia Court of Appeals
Georgia Superior Courts

Notes

References

Citations 
History of the Supreme Court of Georgia (accessed February 17, 2014)
Huebner, Timothy. The Southern Judicial Tradition: State Judges and Sectional Distinctiveness, 1790–1890. Athens, Ga.: University of Georgia Press, 1999.
 Supreme Court of Georgia Rules 
Georgia, S. O. (2016). Rules. Retrieved April 20, 2017, from http://www.gasupreme.us/rules/

External links 
 

Georgia
 
Georgia (U.S. state) state courts
1845 establishments in Georgia (U.S. state)
Courts and tribunals established in 1845